Time for prints (or trade for prints, time for pics, TFP, and sometimes prints for time, PFT) is a term that describes an arrangement between a model and a photographer whereby the photographer agrees to provide the model with a certain number of pictures of selected photographs from the session, and a release or license to use those pictures in return for the model's time. "Time" refers to each person's time spent during the photo shoot and "print" refers to a physically printed photo, usually on photo paper. Both the photographer and the model get together and exchange their time, for free, and each receives the photos for their own usage. Since photos can now be delivered by means other than printed, some variant wordings of this arrangement are time for CD or trade for CD (TFCD). With TFCD, the photographer provides the selection of images on a CD instead of prints. Similarly, with the ease and convenience of digital high-resolution images, the generic term TF* has evolved, where it does not necessarily refer to a tangible CD or printed image since the same accepted rules apply.

There are benefits to both parties of such an arrangement. The model can build a portfolio of photographs to show to prospective clients at little or no cost, while the photographer gets a model for a particular project or their portfolio with little, if any, outlay of cash.

Conditions 
Each photo shoot arranged is usually negotiated separately, and the terms can vary widely. The number of pictures which the photographer delivers to the model can range from a single photograph up to all shots taken. Speed of delivery can vary as well, from a CD burned at the end of the shoot before the model leaves up to several months. Unless such a time period has been specifically discussed and agreed prior to the shoot, finished pictures ideally should be delivered within two weeks.

Usage 
Depending on local laws, a model or photographer might agree to limit or to 'not use' some of the pictures from a shoot. The model or photographer may agree to only use specifically agreed upon pictures (to avoid sub-standard pictures that damage the photographer's or model's reputation), or the photographer may agree to only use certain images in printed publications and not on the internet.

Legal requirements for a model release vary from place to place and from situation to situation, as does the situation regarding copyright. For example, under the Copyright, Designs and Patents Act 1988, a photographer in the United Kingdom can, subject to certain exclusions and unless specifically agreed to the contrary, use any photograph in any way he or she chooses, including selling them for profit. This does not necessarily apply in other countries. These issues should be discussed and agreed prior to the shoot, in writing if necessary.

Variations 
Negotiated compensation for a model's time can range from a straight cash figure, possibly including an amount for travel expenses or, depending on legal requirements, an extra amount for signing a model release, to a simple number of pictures in a chosen format. It can include part-pay, part-TFP arrangements or "Time For Clothes" agreements where the model is given some or all of the clothing which was procured for the shoot.

Testing 
While sometimes people use this term to mean TFP, agencies more commonly use it in the context of sending a new model to a photographer for a short session for portfolio pictures. While the model ultimately pays for these pictures, the agency normally pays in advance and deducts it from the model's earnings. Test shoots are also used by models to build experience.
Test was also created by photographers to try out new ideas for final images to show a client, this is with no payment from either party.

Notes

References 

 

 

Modeling (profession)
Photography